This list of Russian biologists includes the famous biologists from the Russian Federation, the Soviet Union, the Russian Empire and other predecessor states of Russia. Biologists of all specialities may be listed here, including ecologists, botanists, zoologists, paleontologists, biochemists, physiologists and others.

Alphabetical list

A
Johann Friedrich Adam, discoverer of the Adams mammoth, the first complete woolly mammoth skeleton
Igor Akimushkin, biologist
Vladimir Prokhorovich Amalitskii, paleontologist
Nicolai Andrusov, paleontologist
Andrey Avinoff, entomologist
Anatoly Andriyashev, ichthyologist, zoogeographist

B
Karl Ernst von Baer, naturalist, founder of the Russian Entomological Society, formulated embryological Baer's laws
Alexander Barchenko, notable for his research of Hyperborea
Jacques von Bedriaga, prominent herpetologist, described Bedriaga's rock lizard and Bedriaga's skink
Andrey Belozersky, founder of molecular biology
Dmitry Belyayev, domesticated silver fox
Lev Berg, ichthyologist of Central Asia and European Russia
Yuli Berkovich, experimented with seed germination in zero gravity
Nikolai Bernstein, neurophysiologist, coined the term biomechanics
Vladimir Betz, discovered giant pyramidal neurons of primary motor cortex
Anatoli Petrovich Bogdanov, biologist
Andrey Bolotov, major 18th-century agriculturist, discovered dichogamy, pioneered cross-pollination
August von Bongard, botanist of Alaska, discoverer of Sitka spruce and red alder
Antonina Borissova, botanist
Zinaida Botschantzeva, botanist
Alexander Bunge, major botanist of Siberia (especially Altai)
Alexey Bystrow, paleontologist

C
Alexander Catsch, medical doctor and radiation biologist
Mikhail Chailakhyan, researcher of flowering, described the florigen hormone
Maria Cherkasova, ecologist
Evgeny Chernikin, biologist
Feodosy Chernyshov, paleontologist
Sergei Chetverikov, pioneer of modern evolutionary synthesis
Pyotr Chikhachyov, naturalist
Alexander Chizhevsky, founder of heliobiology and modern air ionification

D
Ilya Darevsky, biologist
Nikolay Dubinin, studied the genetic basis of the human individuality in different populations; studied variability and heritability of neuro, and psychodynamic parameters

E
Vladimir Efroimson, Soviet geneticist
Kirill Eskov, biologist, discovered several new genera of spiders
Eduard Eversmann, biologist and explorer, pioneer researcher of flora and fauna of southern Russia

F
Andrey Famintsyn, plant physiologist, inventor of grow lamp, developer of symbiogenesis theory
Mikhail A. Fedonkin, paleontologist
Yuri Filipchenko, entomologist, coined the terms microevolution and macroevolution

G
Oleg Gazenko, zoologist
Johann Georg Gmelin, first researcher of Siberian flora
Vadim G. Gratshev, paleontologist
Viktor Grebennikov, naturalist and entomologist, claimed to have built a levitation platform by attaching dead insect body parts to the underside
Ilya Gruzinov, discovered the source for deep vocal sound is the membrane
Grigory Grum-Grshimailo, zoologist and geographer, obtained two Przewalski's horses and more than 1000 bird specimens from his travels in Central Asia
Alexander Gurwitsch, originated the morphogenetic field theory and discovered the biophoton

Guladi Gogmachadze, doctor of agricultural sciences, professor, professor of agroinformatics department, Lomonosov Moscow State University, Director-General of the All-Russian Scientific Research Institute for Informatization of Agronomy and Ecology (“VNII AgroEcoInform”)

I
Ilya Ivanov, researcher of artificial insemination and the interspecific hybridization of animals, involved in controversial attempts to create a human-ape hybrid
Dmitry Ivanovsky, discoverer of viruses

J
Hans Johansen, zoologist
Hermann Johansen, zoologist

K

Georgii Karpechenko, inventor of rabbage, an early experimental allopolyploid and non-sterile hybrid obtained through crossbreeding of distant species
Karl Fedorovich Kessler, zoologist
Alexander Keyserling, zoologist
Nikolai Koltsov, discoverer of cytoskeleton
Vladimir Komarov, plant geographer, President of the Soviet Academy of Sciences, founder of the Komarov Botanical Institute
Aleksei Alekseevich Korotnev, zoologist
Alexander Kovalevsky, embryologist, major researcher of gastrulation
Vladimir Kovalevsky, studied the effect of meteorological, hydrological, and temperature factors on harvest
Alexey Kondrashov, works on evolutionary genetics. Developed the deterministic mutation hypothesis explaining the maintenance of sexual reproduction, sympatric speciation, and evaluated mutation rates
Boris Kozo-Polyansky, botanist, and evolutionary biologist. First to support the theory of symbiogenesis with Darwinian evolution, and first director of The B.M. Kozo-Polyansky Botanical Garden of Voronezh State University.
August David Krohn, pioneer in marine biology and published essential works on Chaetognatha (arrow worms)
Peter Kropotkin zoologist
Ludmila Kuprianova, botanist
Andrei Kursanov, major physiologist and biochemist
Sergei Kurzanov, paleontologist
Nikolai Jakovlevice Kusnezov, entomologist

L
Alexander Lebedev, known for his work on the biochemical basis of behavior
Olga Lepeshinskaya, advocate of spontaneous generation
Ivan Lepyokhin, botanist
Peter Lesgaft, founder of the modern system of physical education, one of the founders of theoretical anatomy
Vladimir Ippolitovich Lipsky, botanist
Dmitry Litvinov, botanist
Trofim Lysenko, agronomist, developer of yarovization, infamous for lysenkoism

M
Evgeny Maleev, discoverer of Talarurus, Tarbosaurus, and Therizinosaurus
Karl Maximovich, pioneer researcher of the Far Eastern flora
Ilya Mechnikov, pioneer researcher of immune system, probiotics and phagocytosis, coined the term gerontology, Nobel Prize in Medicine winner
Zhores Medvedev, biologist
Ivan Vladimirovich Michurin, botanist
Nicholas Miklouho-Maclay, ethnologist
Sergei Mirkin, DNA researcher
Andrey Vasilyevich Martynov, entomologist
Mikhail Menzbier, major ornithologist, discoverer of the Menzbier's marmot
Konstantin Merezhkovsky, major lichenologist, developer of symbiogenesis theory, a founder of endosymbiosis theory
Ivan Michurin, pomologist, selectionist and geneticist, practiced crossing of geographically distant plants, created hundreds of fruit cultivars
Alexander Middendorf, zoologist and explorer, studied the influence of permafrost on living beings, coined the term "radula", horse breeder
Victor Motschulsky, coleopterologist (researcher of beetles)
Dmitrii Mushketov, paleontologist

N
Sergei Navashin, discovered double fertilization
Alexander Mikhailovich Nikolsky, zoologist

O
Vladimir Obruchev, paleontologist
Sergey Ognev, for his work on mammalogy
Alexey Olovnikov, predicted existence of telomerase, suggested the telomere hypothesis of aging and the telomere relations to cancer
Aleksandr Oparin, biologist and biochemist, proposed the "primordial soup" theory of life origin, showed that many food production processes are based on biocatalysis
Yuri Ovchinnikov, proponent of using molecular biology and genetics for creating new types of biological weapons

P
Heinz Christian Pander, embryologist, discoverer of germ layers
Peter Simon Pallas, polymath naturalist and explorer, discoverer of multiple animals, including the Pallas's cat, Pallas's squirrel, and Pallas's gull
Vladimir Pasechnik, biologist
Ivan Pavlov, founder of modern physiology, the first to research classical conditioning, Nobel Prize in Medicine winner
Alexander Petrunkevitch, eminent arachnologist of his time. Described over 130 spider species
Nikolay Pirogov, founded field surgery. Was one of the first surgeons in Europe to use ether as an anaesthetic
Vladimir Pravdich-Neminsky, published the first EEG and the evoked potential of the mammalian brain
Yevgenia Georgievna Pobedimova, botanist and plant collector, notably in Russia, Ukraine and North Asia
Maria Prokhorova, biologist and physiologist, did a research on gas gangrene during the Great Patriotic War
Nikolai Przhevalsky, explorer and naturalist, brought vast collections from Central Asia, discovered the only extant species of wild horse

R
Tikhon Rabotnov, made ground breaking studies in the regeneration of natural plant communities
Leonty Ramensky, studied biotic communities
Alexandr Pavlovich Rasnitsyn, paleontologist
Anatoly Rozhdestvensky, discoverer of Aralosaurus and Probactrosaurus
Vasiliy E. Ruzhentsev, paleontologist

S
Ivan Schmalhausen, developer of modern evolutionary synthesis
Leopold von Schrenck, ethnographer, zoologist, discovered the Amur sturgeon, Manchurian black water snake and Schrenck's bittern
Boris Schwanwitsch, entomologist, applied colour patterns of insect wings to military camouflage during World War II
Ivan Sechenov, founder of electrophysiology and neurophysiology
Andrey Semyonov-Tyan-Shansky, entomologist
Aleksandr Grigorevich Sharov, paleontologist
Pyotr Shirshov, hydrobiologist, participant of many arctic expeditions including the first drifting ice station, North Pole-1, researched plankton in polar regions and proved there is life in high altitudes of the Arctic Ocean, founded and headed the Shirshov Institute of Oceanology
Victor Shmidt, zoologist, leading Russian specialist in microscopic anatomy and embryology
Aleksandr Aleksandrovich Shmuk, studied the biochemistry of tobacco
Julian Simashko, zoologist
Norair Sisakian, biochemist, one of the founders of space biology, pioneer in biochemistry of sub-cell structures and technical biochemistry
Alexey Skvortsov, botanist
Boris Sergeyevich Sokolov, paleontologist
Alexander Spirin, made significant contributions to the biochemistry of nucleic acids, and protein biosynthesis
Yaroslav Starobogatov, zoologist
Georg Wilhelm Steller, naturalist, participant of Vitus Bering's voyages, discoverer of Steller's jay, Steller's eider, extinct Steller's sea cow and multiple other animals
Lina Stern, pioneer researcher of blood–brain barrier and first female full member of the Russian Academy of Sciences
Vladimir Sukachev, geobotanist

T
Armen Takhtajan, developer of Takhtajan system of flowering plant classification, major biogeographer
Valery Taliev,  the founder of concept of the role of man in the spreading of plants during Holocene, geobotanist
Aleksandr Tikhomirov, zoologist
Kliment Timiryazev, plant physiologist and evolutionist, major researcher of chlorophyll
Nikolai Timofeeff-Ressovsky, major researcher of radiation genetics, population genetics, and microevolution
Vladimir Andreevich Tranzschel, mycologist, expert on rust fungi
Lev Tsenkovsky, pioneer researcher of the ontogenesis of lower plants and animals
Mikhail Tsvet, inventor of chromatography
Mikhail Voronin, major researcher of fungi and plant pathology

V
Nikolai Vavilov, botanist and geneticist, gathered the world's largest collection of plant seeds, identified the centres of origin of main cultivated plants
Vladimir Vernadsky, founded biogeochemistry, pioneered research into the noosphere
Olga Vinogradova, accomplished neuroscientist
Sergey Vinogradsky, microbiologist, ecologist, and soil scientist, pioneered the biogeochemical cycle concept, discovered lithotrophy and chemosynthesis, invented the Winogradsky column for breeding of microorganisms
Roman Vishniac, biologist

W
Sergei Winogradsky, microbiologist, ecologist and soil scientist who pioneered the cycle of life concept

Y
Gennady Yakovlev, botanist
Ivan Yefremov, paleontologist, sci-fi author, founded taphonomy

Z
Sviatoslav Zabelin, biologist, awarded the Goldman Environmental Prize
Sergey Zimov, creator of the Pleistocene Park
Nikolai Zograf, zoologist
Valeriy Zyuganov, formulated the concept of freshwater pearl mussel - Atlantic salmon symbiosis

See also

List of biologists
List of Russian physicians and psychologists
List of Russian explorers
List of Russian Earth scientists
List of Russian scientists
Science and technology in Russia

References

 
 
Biologists
Russian
Russian biologists